The Société Française de Fabrication de Bébés et Jouets ("French Concern for Manufacturing Dolls and Toys" often referred to by its initials. S.F.B.J.) was a large doll making consortium founded in France by the union of a number of major French doll companies including Jumeau and Bru and the Franco-German doll company Fleischmann & Bloedel in 1899. The company went out of business in the late 1950s.

The S.F.B.J. made dolls in France and also assembled dolls with both French and German sourced parts. Its dolls were made of many materials including bisque, composition and early plastics - in the later years of the firm. The S.F.B.J. made dolls from fine to cheap qualities and also had a large, well-equipped dressmaking branch. There were many different moulds including character dolls modelled after real children and dolls designed by French artists. S.F.B.J. dolls were used for tourist souvenirs as well as children's toys. The popular Bleuette dolls were one of its most high profiled products.

References
 Juliette Peers, The Fashion Doll From Bébé Jumeau to Barbie, Berg Publishers Oxford 2004
 

Doll manufacturing companies
Toy companies of France
Toy companies established in the 19th century
Manufacturing companies established in 1899
French companies established in 1899